Francisco Bertrand Barahona (9 October 1866 – 15 July 1926) was a Honduran politician. He was a two-term President of Honduras, first from 28 March 1911 to 1 February 1912, and then again between 21 March 1913 and 9 September 1919. His successor and predecessor was Manuel Bonilla, and Bertrand served as the Vice President in Bonilla's cabinet. He was a member of the National Party.

Bertrand started out with a reputation as a conciliator, but during his last presidency was involved in armed conflict with his political opponents. It is believed that United States of America pressure was behind his abandoning the post of President. He spent the next few years in exile before returning to La Ceiba, Honduras. He died on 15 July 1926.

He was married to Victoria Alvarado Burchard who had five children named Laura Azucena Bertrand, Francisco Bertrand, Marta Bertrand Alvarado, Luz Marina Bertrand Alvarado and Victoria Bertrand Alvarado.

1866 births
Presidents of Honduras
Vice presidents of Honduras
1926 deaths
National Party of Honduras politicians
Honduran physicians
19th-century physicians
Honduran exiles